Anne Beathe Kristiansen Tvinnereim (née Kristiansen, born 22 May 1974) is a Norwegian diplomat and politician of the Centre Party. She has served as minister of international development since 2021, and the party's second deputy leader since 2014.

Career
Born in Halden, Tvinnereim has studied political science at the University of Costa Rica and the University of Oslo. From 2000 to 2002 she was leader of the Centre Youth, and she was political advisor for the Centre Party's parliamentarians at the Storting from 2002 to 2005. She was assigned as secretary at the Norwegian embassy in Maputo, Mozambique (2007–2011). From 2006 to 2011 she was political adviser in the Ministry of Transport and Communications. She served as State Secretary in the Ministry of Local Government and Regional Development from February 2011 to October 2013. In 2014 she was elected second deputy leader of the Centre Party.

Minister of International Development
On 14 October 2021, Tvinnereim was appointed minister of international development and minister of Nordic Cooperation in Støre's Cabinet.

When John-Arne Røttingen was elected to be one of the ten international members of the National Academy of Medicine, Tvinnereim issued her congratulations, saying: "It is nice to be able to congratulate Røttingen on this membership. We see that an important part of the solution to the global health challenges lies in international research collaboration. Norway has high confidence and the opportunity to act on complex global health issues. This appointment shows that we have the expertise it requires to continue the Norwegian commitment in global health and make a difference".

Tvinnereim and the government announced an increased priority for food safety and smaller farmers in the south in the development budget. Tvinnereim stated that the government wanted to prioritise the environment and food a lot more than the previous government, and that the fight against hunger was a number one priority.

On 9 December, Tvinnereim announced that Norway would enter an agreement with the World Food Programme to support locally produced school food in Ethiopia, Malawi and Niger. She went on to say: "Something as simple as a meal at school has countless ripple effects both for children's development and for local communities. We see that more people go to school when they get food. I'm very happy to sign the agreement with the World Food Program today. Norway contributes with 50 million NOK to school food programs in three countries, and to strengthen WFP's cooperation with the African Union on this important work".

On 16 December, a proposal to establish a new UNICEF office in Oslo was voted down in the Storting. Liberal Party leader Guri Melby criticised the government for removing help to "the most vulnerable of the vulnerable". Tvinnereim denied that there was a partisan issue, and stated that "the government reserves the right to adjust the instruments we use". She also said believed "it is a wrong use of development assistance funds to allocate half a billion kroner over ten years to manage a center in Oslo".

At the annual Norad conference on 25 January 2022, Tvinnereim spoke critically of food safety. She announced that the government would spend the next year and a half to prioritise and work with said investment. She also emphasised how the issue effects smaller and poorer producers, and that she looked forward to enter dialog with civil society organisations and other actors about the issue for the next coming months.

During a parliamentary session in March, Tvinnereim announced that with the exception of 250 million NOK would be given to humanitarian aid in Ukraine, and these would not be taken from other humanitarian aids. She also assured that it would not hinder humanitarian aid to other parts of the world.

Ahead of the Our Ocean conference in April, Tvinnereim stressed the importance of maintaining healthy oceans for future generations: "The ocean is in crisis, and we must act now to ensure a healthy and productive sea. We are completely dependent on the sea for food, prosperity and jobs.  The sea is a resource that must be managed in a sustainable way so that future generations can also benefit from it". She went on to talk about productive oceans, saying: "Healthy and productive oceans are fundamental to many communities around the world. And it is especially important in poor countries, and for small island states like Palau. Food from the sea is a crucial source of food security. Norway's efforts will contribute to ensuring good living conditions for communities living by and by the sea, and making them resistant to climate change".

On 24 June, Tvinnereim attended the international Uniting for Global Food Security conference in Berlin, Germany. She emphasised the importance of food security and Norway's efforts to combat the issue. Tvinnereim also thanked the host country for their inviative, while also expressing expectations for the G7 countries to take responsibility and action, and assured that Norway would follow up on the G7's proposals in the fight against world hunger.

On 12 September, Tvinnereim announced that Norway would be strengthening its global pandemic efforts. Among the measures would be a seed means financial mechanism that would assist with pandemic readiness. She stated: "After more than two years with a pandemic, Norway is embarking on a new initiative to strengthen the world's pandemic preparedness. This will reduce the risk and consequences of a new pandemic. The Covid-19 pandemic has shown the importance of strengthening global health preparedness, particularly in poor countries. If a virus is allowed to continue to develop in one country, it will threaten the health security of all of us".

In the wake of the government's state budget for 2023, Tvinnereim sat down with international aid organisations to hear their opinions on the cuts for international aid. Dagbladet later revealed that Tvinnereim was working to find other means of money then the state budget for international aid. According to Dagbladet, Tvinnereim was said to have become furious and tearful when it was revealed that the government was planning to remove billions of NOK from international aid in the 2023 state budget. In early August, she had been assured of the opposite by prime minister Støre, while during the budget conference on 31 August, no money was announced to be allocated to international aid.

Tvinnereim visited Somalia in early December, and also announced that Norway would spend 25 million NOK in development aid to help Somalia combat drought.

During her attendance at the 59th Munich Security Conference in February 2023, Tvinnereim told media that "we should respect that the war in Ukraine looks different for other countries in the South", specifically referring to a military exercise conducted by South Africa and Russia. She also specified that contact with South African authorities would be maintained despite this.

Other activities
 World Bank, Ex-Officio Member of the Board of Governors (since 2021)

References

1974 births
Living people
Centre Party (Norway) politicians
Ministers of International Development of Norway
Norwegian diplomats
Norwegian state secretaries
Norwegian women state secretaries
University of Costa Rica alumni
University of Oslo alumni
Women government ministers of Norway